The Colonnade egg is a jewelled enameled Easter egg made by Henrik Wigström  under the supervision of the Russian jeweller Peter Carl Fabergé in 1910.  The Fabergé egg was made for Nicholas II of Russia, who presented it to his wife, Alexandra Feodorovna to celebrate the birth of their only son, the tsarevich Alexei.  As a clock-egg, the Colonnade egg contained no surprise.

Design
The Colonnade egg is made of Bowenite, four-colour gold, silver-gilt, platinum, guilloché enamel and rose diamonds. It is one of only four Faberge Easter Eggs to include a clock in the design. The Colonnade Egg features a rotary clock made by the Swiss firm Henry Moser & Cie.

The egg symbolizes a temple of love. A pair of platinum doves represent the love of Nicholas and Alexandra. Four silver-gilt cherubs sit around the base of the egg, each representing Nicholas and Alexandra's four daughters: Anastasia, Olga, Maria, and Tatiana. Alexei is represented by a silver-gilt cupid, which surmounts the egg.

History
Purchased for 11,600 roubles the Colonnade Egg was presented to Alexandra at Eastertide 1910 to celebrate the 1904 birth of Alexei, the fifth child and only son of Nicholas and Alexandra.  After giving birth to four daughters, the birth of their first and only son was significant because it ensured a direct heir to the throne, rather than succession passing to Grand Duke Michael Alexandrovich of Russia, the younger brother of Nicholas II.

Upon the abdication of Nicholas II and the imprisonment of the family in 1917, the Colonnade Egg was confiscated by the provisional government. It then appears on a 1922 list of confiscated treasures moved from the Anichkov Palace to the Sovnarkom, which was a state-run organization which collected and conserved treasures. In 1927 the Colonnade Egg was sold as one of nine eggs to Emanuel Snowman of London antique dealer Wartski. Two years later it was sold to Queen Mary of Teck and inherited by Queen Elizabeth II in 1953. It remains in the Royal Collection.

From July to October 2011, the Colonnade Egg was featured in the Royal Fabergé exhibition during the summer opening of Buckingham Palace.

Other Fabergé eggs in the Royal Collection include:
 Twelve Panel, 1899, Alexander Kelch to his wife Barbara (Varvara) Kelch-Bazanova.
 Basket of Wild Flowers, 1901, Gift of Nicholas II to Empress Alexandra Feodorovna.
 Mosaic, 1914, gift of Nicholas II to Empress Alexandra Feodorovna.

Modifications
The piece suffered several alterations from its original condition, easily recognizable thanks to a historical photograph. First, the cupid is now missing a silver-gilt staff or twig which was held in his right hand and pointed to the rotating dial ring below to indicate the hour. So a fixed arrow mounted at the temple's top is used instead for this purpose. Lastly, the protruding finial at the egg's base is a later addition too.

See also
Egg decorating
Tsarevich (Fabergé egg)

References

Sources

The 1910 Colonnade Egg:A Possible Source Is Proposed

External links
 
Images of the Colonnade Egg, Buckingham Palace Royal Fabergé exhibition (Flickr).
A detailed article on the 'Colonnade' egg from wintraecken.nl

1910 works
Imperial Fabergé eggs
Fabergé eggs of the Royal Collection of the United Kingdom
Fabergé clock eggs